The Jonas Salisbury House is a historic house at 85 Langley Road in Newton, Massachusetts.  The -story Greek Revival house was built in 1847, and is particularly significant because its original construction contract has survived.  The house was built by Henry Fuller for Jonas Salisbury, a local landowner, at a cost of $2,630.  Salisbury sold the house in 1853 for $4,000; it is unclear whether he ever lived in the house.

The house was listed on the National Register of Historic Places in 1986.

See also
 Jonas Salisbury House (62 Walnut Park), a probably Salisbury residence
 National Register of Historic Places listings in Newton, Massachusetts

References

Houses on the National Register of Historic Places in Newton, Massachusetts
Houses completed in 1847
Greek Revival architecture in Massachusetts